Calamotropha hierichuntica is a species of moth in the family Crambidae described by Philipp Christoph Zeller in 1867. It is found in Greece, Israel, Jordan and Syria.

The forewings are luteous (muddy) grey. The hindwings are pale grey, with a darker blotch before the middle of the hindmargin.

References

Moths described in 1867
Crambinae
Moths of Europe
Moths of Asia